Jeffrey Robert Hoffman (born January 8, 1993) is an American professional baseball pitcher in the Minnesota Twins organization. He previously played in Major League Baseball (MLB) for the Colorado Rockies and Cincinnati Reds. Hoffman played college baseball at East Carolina University.

Early career

High school
Hoffman attended Shaker High School in Latham, New York, and played for their baseball team as a pitcher. In his junior year, he pitched to a 7–0 win–loss record. In Hoffman's senior year, he led Shaker High School to their first Section II Class AA title game since 2002 against town rival Colonie High School. Hoffman pitched seven shutout innings, 101 pitches and struck out nine. He struggled to be noticed by college baseball programs in the National Collegiate Athletic Association's Division I, as his fastball averaged . This led to his signing a letter of intent with East Carolina University (ECU), a Division I school in Conference USA.

College
During his freshman year with the East Carolina Pirates baseball team in 2012, Hoffman started 10 of the 19 games in which he appeared, posting a 3–2 record, one save, a 3.67 earned run average (ERA), and struck out 55 batters in  innings pitched. East Carolina reached the National Collegiate Athletic Association Division I baseball tournament. 

During the 2013 season Hoffman posted a 6–7 record, a 3.20 ERA, led the Pirates with  innings pitched and 84 strikeouts, was named to the All-Conference USA second team, and was added to the Golden Spikes Award watch list. In his junior year at ECU, Hoffman went 3–3 with a 2.94 ERA before suffering a torn ulnar collateral ligament in his right elbow injury that required Tommy John surgery.

In 2012 and 2013, Hoffman played collegiate summer baseball for the Hyannis Harbor Hawks of the Cape Cod Baseball League (CCBL), where he was named a league all-star in 2012, and received the league's Outstanding Pro Prospect award in 2013.

Professional career

Toronto Blue Jays
Hoffman was considered to be one of the best prospects available in the 2014 Major League Baseball Draft, with the potential to be selected first overall, before his injury lowered his draft stock. The Toronto Blue Jays selected Hoffman in the first round, with the ninth overall selection, and he signed with Toronto on July 2 for the full bonus slot value of $3.1 million. Though unable to pitch, Hoffman was assigned to the Rookie Gulf Coast League Blue Jays for the 2014 season. He began throwing off a mound in February 2015, and made his professional debut with the Dunedin Blue Jays of the Advanced-A Florida State League on May 20. Hoffman's fastball reached  during his first start. After making 11 starts with Dunedin, the Blue Jays promoted Hoffman to the New Hampshire Fisher Cats of the Double-A Eastern League. He made his first start for New Hampshire on July 18, pitching a career-high  innings and allowing two earned runs.

Colorado Rockies
On July 28, the Blue Jays traded Hoffman, José Reyes, Miguel Castro, and Jesús Tinoco, to the Colorado Rockies for Troy Tulowitzki and LaTroy Hawkins. Hoffman was assigned to the New Britain Rock Cats of the Eastern League following the trade. Hoffman began the 2016 season with the Albuquerque Isotopes of the Class AAA Pacific Coast League. He was selected to appear in the 2016 All-Star Futures Game. Hoffman made his major league debut for the Rockies on August 20. Hoffman continued to remain in the rotation for the remainder of the season, finishing with a record of 0-4. The following season, he split time between the AAA level and the Rockies rotation. He was 6–5 with an ERA of 5.89 in 23 games, 16 starts. In 2018, Hoffman spent the majority of the season at the AAA level, only making 6 appearances for the Rockies. In 2019, Hoffman was 2–6 with a 6.56 ERA in 15 starts. In 2020, Hoffman was used exclusively out of the bullpen and in the shortened season, he struggled to a career worst 9.28 ERA in 16 games.

Cincinnati Reds
On November 25, 2020, the Colorado Rockies traded Hoffman and Case Williams to the Cincinnati Reds in exchange for Jameson Hannah and Robert Stephenson. In 2021, Hoffman made 31 appearances (11 starts) for Cincinnati, working to a 3-5 record and 4.56 ERA with 79 strikeouts in 73.0 innings pitched.

In 2022, Hoffman appeared in 35 games for the Reds, improving to a 2-0 record and 3.83 ERA with 45 strikeouts in 44.2 innings of work. On November 15, 2022, Hoffman was designated for assignment. On November 18, he was non-tendered and became a free agent.

Minnesota Twins
On February 26, 2023, Hoffman signed a minor league contract with the Minnesota Twins organization.

References

External links

1993 births
Living people
People from Latham, New York
Baseball players from New York (state)
Major League Baseball pitchers
Colorado Rockies players
Cincinnati Reds players
East Carolina Pirates baseball players
Dunedin Blue Jays players
New Hampshire Fisher Cats players
New Britain Rock Cats players
Albuquerque Isotopes players
Hyannis Harbor Hawks players